The Philippines national under-19 football team is the national football team of the Philippines and represents in international football competitions such as AFF U-19 Youth Championship and any other under-19 international football tournaments. The team is controlled by the Philippine Football Federation (PFF), the governing body of football in the Philippines.

Competition records

FIFA World Youth Championship

AFC Youth Championship

AFF Youth Championship

Results and fixtures

2022

Personnel

Current technical staff
Updated as of July 2022

Coaching history

Players

Current squad
Caps and goals updated as of 18 September 2022, after the match against .

Recent call-ups

The following players have been called up for the Philippines U19 within the past 12 months.

Honours

Minor tournaments
 Kanga Cup: 2013

See also
 Football in the Philippines

Men's
 Philippines national football team
 Philippines national under-23 football team
 Philippines national under-21 football team
 Philippines national under-17 football team

Women's
 Philippines women's national football team
 Philippines women's national under-20 football team

References

External links
 Philippine Football Federation

Asian national under-19 association football teams
under-19
U-19